Pseudopagyda is a genus of moths in the family Crambidae. It contains only one species, Pseudopagyda homoculorum, which is found in Thailand.

References

Crambidae genera
Pyraustinae
Monotypic moth genera